Cindy Bear is a cartoon character created by Hanna-Barbera Productions.  She is one of the primary supporting characters of the Yogi Bear franchise as well as a regular in the stable of frequently appearing Hanna-Barbera animated personalities.  Cindy was originally portrayed by voice actress Julie Bennett, who reprised the part for most of her appearances from the 1960s through the 1980s.

Personality
Cindy Bear is the love interest of Yogi Bear and a resident of Jellystone Park. She speaks with a pronounced Southern accent, and she carries a parasol.  Cindy rarely engages in the same antics as Yogi and Boo-Boo and does not share the same antagonistic relationship with Ranger Smith.  Her romance with Yogi Bear is typically portrayed as on-again/off-again, with her pursuing him while he avoids and evades her advances.  Just as often, however, Yogi is shown to return her affections.

Development

Cindy Bear was originally designed by Ed Benedict.  One early sketch saw her clad in a bonnet, a frilly scarf and an apron with an elongated, pointed muzzle.  A second sketch dropped all accessories save the frill scarf and shortened her muzzle.

Cindy made her debut in the 1961 television series The Yogi Bear Show as a semi-recurring character.  Her finalized animation design featured blue/grey fur, a hat, a white frill scarf and a necklace.

Cindy appeared prominently in the 1964 feature film Hey There, It's Yogi Bear! in which she is kidnapped, spurring Yogi and Boo-Boo to come to her rescue.  She was redesigned by art director Iwao Takamoto for the film into the more familiar modern version with light brown fur and a yellow scarf.

Cindy has received a few slightly different, one-off redesigns.  In Yogi's First Christmas, she was given dark brown fur and white hair, as well as a number of different outfits which she wore throughout the film.  For the Spümcø short "Boo Boo Runs Wild", she retained her modern character design, but with the blue/grey fur of her original design. Yo Yogi! featured a preteen Cindy Bear with a significant redesign, wearing a modern 1990s outfit consisting of a white skirt/top, purple jacket, purple shorts, white boots and a ponytail.

Cindy Bear appears in Jellystone! as a medical doctor.

Animated media

Television shows
1961 - The Yogi Bear Show (segments "Acrobatty Bear", "A Wooin' Bruin" and "Yogi's Birthday Party")
1973 - Yogi's Gang (episodes "Gossipy Witch" and "Mr. Hothead")
1977 - Laff-A-Lympics
1985 - Yogi's Treasure Hunt (episodes "To Bee or Not to Bee", "Yogi and the Beanstalk" and "Secret Agent Bear")
1988 - The New Yogi Bear Show
1990 - Wake, Rattle, and Roll
1991 - Yo Yogi!
1999 - Boo Boo Runs Wild
2002 - What's New, Scooby-Doo? (episode "Roller Ghoster Ride") (cameo as toy)
2004 - Harvey Birdman, Attorney at Law (episode "Droopy Botox")
2021 - Jellystone!

Films and specials
1964 - Hey There, It's Yogi Bear! (singing voice by Jackie Ward)
1980 - Yogi's First Christmas
1988 - Yogi and the Invasion of the Space Bears (singing voice by Linda Harmon)
1989 - Hanna-Barbera's 50th: A Yabba Dabba Doo Celebration
2013 - Scooby-Doo! Mask of the Blue Falcon (cameo as picture)

Comics

While only a recurring character in the animated shorts, Cindy Bear featured prominently in the various Yogi Bear and other Hanna-Barbera comics published by Dell Comics, Charlton Comics and Marvel Comics.

Cindy made her debut in Dell's Yogi Bear #5, detailing her back story.  It is revealed that Ranger Smith had her transferred to Jellystone from Red Oak National Park in a scheme to hamper Yogi's mischief by distracting him with Cindy's persistent wooing.  The plot eventually backfires when Yogi succumbs to Cindy's advances and begins stealing twice as many picnic baskets to feed her.

She would also appear frequently in the Charlton Comics series, drawn in both her early design and her revised design.

Cindy also appeared as a participant in Marvel's Laff-A-Lympics comic series. In Laff-A-Lympics #5, she helps uncover a false identity scheme by the Really Rottens. In Laff-A-Lympics #13, she was revealed to be the team's chef during the offseason....at least until the eating habits of Grape Ape drove her to quit.

Licensing
 Cindy Bear can be regularly encountered as a costumed meet-and-greet character at a chain of recreational vehicle and camping parks ("Yogi Bear's Jellystone Park Camp Resorts").  The first of these parks opened in 1969 in Sturgeon Bay, Wisconsin.  As of 2011, over 70  locations have hosted the parks.

References

Cindy
Fictional bears
Hanna-Barbera characters
Female characters in animated series
Television characters introduced in 1961
Female characters in animation